The North Carolina Tar Heels field hockey team represent the University of North Carolina at Chapel Hill in the Atlantic Coast Conference of NCAA Division I field hockey.

History 
Field hockey has been played at the University of North Carolina since the 1940s, but it only became a varsity sport in 1971 when the school was a charter member of the Association for Intercollegiate Athletics for Women (AIAW). The team won several state AIAW championships and finished second twice in the AIAW Southern Region II tournament before joining the National Collegiate Athletic Association (NCAA) for the 1982 season.

Stadium 
Originally operated as Navy Field, it was redeveloped as a multi-use stadium, Francis E. Henry Stadium, primarily for the use by field hockey. The stadium, with a 1,086 seating capacity, was opened on April 24, 1999. It was heavily renovated in 1999, with a private donation to UNC. The Francis E. Henry Stadium was demolished in 2017.

In August 2018, the Tar Heels inaugurated a new stadium complex dedicated solely to field hockey and named in honor of their head coach, Karen Shelton. Karen Shelton Stadium is a modern 900-seat stadium with additional standing-room space with a total capacity of 1,000.  The stadium includes fan amenities (e.g., concessions and restrooms), three-level press and scorers boxes, and LED sport lighting and an LED video scoreboard. The Polytan field surface is considered rare among collegiate field hockey and has been described by USA Field Hockey as "top-of-the-line".

The stadium complex also includes a 10,000 square foot team building with home and visitor locker rooms, an area for team meals and functions, theater, sports medicine space, a players' lounge, meeting space and coaches' offices.

Karen Shelton Stadium has been described by the international field hockey press as the best field hockey facility in the United States and "one of the best facilities anywhere in world hockey".

All-time record

Individual honors 

Kit number seven (honoring Leslie Lyness), number nine (honoring Rachel Dawson) and number thirteen (honoring Cindy Werley) have been retired.

See also
List of NCAA Division I field hockey programs

References

Citations

Bibliography

External links

Official website